Odina may refer to:

Surname
Mercedes Odina (born 1959), Spanish journalist, author, and film director

Given name
Odina Bayramova (born 1990), Azerbaijani volleyball player
Odina Desrochers (born 1951), Canadian politician

Place
Odina, Permsky District, Perm Krai, village in Russia
Chernoyarskaya Odina, village in Russia

Biology
Odina (genus), a genus of skipper butterfly